Bill Evely (27 July 1934 – 26 June 2015) was an Australian rules footballer who played with Richmond in the Victorian Football League (VFL).		

Evely also played and coached numerous teams in the Bendigo District Cricket Association, where he was inducted into the Hall of Fame.

Notes

External links 
		

1934 births
2015 deaths
Australian rules footballers from Victoria (Australia)
Richmond Football Club players
Eaglehawk Football Club players